Hacıahmetli is a Turkish place name and may refer to:
Hacıəhmədli, a village in Barda Rayon, Azerbaijan
Hacıahmetli, Mut, a village in Mersin Province, Turkey